Back For The Attack was a professional wrestling pay-per-view (PPV) event promoted by the National Wrestling Alliance (NWA). The event took place on March 21, 2021 in Atlanta, Georgia at GPB Studios, and aired exclusively on FITE TV. This was the first live event produced by the NWA since Hard Times on January 24, 2020, as the promotion halted operations due to the COVID-19 pandemic. The event was in memory of NWA wrestler Joseph "Jocephus" Hudson (who also portrayed The Question Mark), who died February 24, 2021.

Six matches were contested at the event. In the main event, Nick Aldis defeated Aron Stevens to retain the NWA Worlds Heavyweight Championship. In other prominent matches, Trevor Murdoch defeated Chris Adonis to retain the NWA National Championship, Kamille defeated Thunder Rosa to become the number one contender to the NWA World Women's Championship, and Da Pope fought Thom Latimer to a draw for the NWA World Television Championship.

Production

Storylines
On the NWA's official Twitter account and FITE TV description, the promotion has already scheduled appearances from NWA talent and wrestlers from the independent scene. Names include Tim Storm, Thunder Rosa, NWA World Television Champion Elijah Burke, NWA National Champion Trevor Murdoch, Tyrus, and Chris Adonis.

The main event of the PPV will see Aron Stevens - one half of the NWA World Tag Team Champions with J. R. Kratos, former NWA National Champion, and tag team partner of Hudson - challenging Nick Aldis for the NWA Worlds Heavyweight Championship. Also on the card is a four-way match between Jordan Clearwater, Slice Boogie, Crimson, and former NWA World Heavyweight Champion Jax Dane.

On March 15, a match between Thunder Rosa and Kamille was scheduled for the event, with the winner receiving a shot at Serena Deeb's NWA World Women's Championship. Rosa and Kamille have had previous encounters while the former was champion, as after Rosa's title defense against Melina on the January 25 NWA Power, Kamille would come out and spear former champion Allysin Kay; making her title aspirations clear. Taryn Terrell, who recently came out of retirement after three years, made her debut on commentary for the match and had expressed her desire to go after the title.

The event also saw the NWA change the time limit for the NWA World Television Championship matches from six minutes and five seconds to ten minutes for pay-per-view title matches.

Results

Notes

References

External links

National Wrestling Alliance pay-per-view events
2021 in professional wrestling
2021 in Georgia (U.S. state)
Events in Atlanta
Professional wrestling in Atlanta
March 2021 events in the United States
National Wrestling Alliance shows